"You Two-Timed Me One Time Too Often" written in 1945 by Jenny Lou Carson and performed by Tex Ritter, was the first number one country music hit written by a woman.

Chart performance
It was Ritter's second number one on the Juke Box Folk chart, spending eleven weeks at the top and a total of twenty weeks on the chart.

Cover Versions
It was subsequently  recorded by: the 
Hoosier Hot Shots
Walt Shrum
Doc Denning
Helen O'Connell
Sue Thompson
Jimmie Dale 
Wesley Tuttle 
Doc Watson
Harley Huggins
Red Foley
Durwood Haddock
Johnny Carroll.

References

1945 songs
1945 singles
Tex Ritter songs
Songs written by Jenny Lou Carson
Capitol Records singles